The 2023 Oklahoma Sooners football team  will represent the University of Oklahoma during the 2023 NCAA Division I FBS football season, the 129th season for the  Oklahoma Sooners. They will be led by second-year head coach Brent Venables. They will play their home games at Gaylord Family Oklahoma Memorial Stadium in Norman, Oklahoma. They are a charter member of the Big 12 Conference.

The season marks the team's last season as members of the Big 12 Conference before joining the Southeastern Conference on July 1, 2024.

Previous season 
The Sooners finished the 2022 season 6–6, 3–6 in Big 12 play. Finishing 7th in the conference. The Sooners received an invite to play in the Cheez-It Bowl against Florida State losing 32–35, giving them a 6–7 record and handing the Sooners their first losing season since 1998.

Offseason

Recruiting

Oklahoma was ranked fourth by 247Sports in the 2023 college football recruiting class.

Schedule
Oklahoma and the Big 12 announced the 2023 conference schedule on January 31, 2023. The 2023 schedule consists of 4 home games, 4 away games and 1 neutral-site game in the regular season. The Sooners will host 2 non-conference games against Arkansas State and SMU and will travel to Tulsa. Oklahoma will host Iowa State, UCF, West Virginia, and TCU, and travel to BYU, Cincinnati, Kansas, and Oklahoma State. Oklahoma will play Texas in Dallas, Texas at the Cotton Bowl Stadium in the Red River Showdown, the 119th game played in the series.

Game summaries

vs. Arkansas State

vs. SMU

at Tulsa

at Cincinnati

vs. Iowa State

vs Texas

vs. UCF

at Kansas

at Oklahoma State

vs. West Virginia

at BYU

vs. TCU

References

Oklahoma
Oklahoma Sooners football seasons
Oklahoma Sooners football